Regimental Sergeant Major James Clarke VC (6 April 189416 June 1947) was an English recipient of the Victoria Cross, the highest and most prestigious award for gallantry in the face of the enemy that can be awarded to British and Commonwealth forces.

He was born in Winsford, Cheshire. Leaving school at the age of 14, he worked as a day-labourer, before enlisting in the Lancashire Fusiliers in October 1915. He was 24 years old and an acting company sergeant major in the 15th Battalion, Lancashire Fusiliers, British Army during the First World War when he performed the deeds which resulted in the award of the Victoria Cross. His citation reads:

The forename in the original citation was subsequently corrected.

He did not find much success in civilian life. On 8 June 1946, Clarke participated in the World War II Victory Parade. He died the following year of pneumonia. His VC is on display in the Lord Ashcroft Gallery at the Imperial War Museum, London.

References

Further reading
Monuments to Courage (David Harvey, 1999)
The Register of the Victoria Cross (This England, 1997)
VCs of the First World War - The Final Days 1918 (Gerald Gliddon, 2000)

External links

Regimental details of Clarke and his VC

1894 births
1947 deaths
Burials in Lancashire
People from Winsford
British World War I recipients of the Victoria Cross
Lancashire Fusiliers soldiers
British Army personnel of World War I
Deaths from pneumonia in England
British Army recipients of the Victoria Cross
Military personnel from Cheshire